Košarkarski klub Koper, commonly referred to as KK Koper or simply Koper, was a basketball club based in Koper, Slovenia. After the dissolution of the former Yugoslavia the club played in the Slovenian League. The team played their home games at Bonifika Hall.

Their greatest success was participation in the final series of the championship in 1992–93, where they were defeated by Olimpija 3–1.

Names through history
 Micom Marcus (1992)
 Slovenica (1993–1994)
 Luka Koper (2007–2010)

Basketball teams established in 1926
Basketball teams in Slovenia
Basketball teams in Yugoslavia
1926 establishments in Slovenia
Sport in Koper
Basketball teams disestablished in 2010
2010 disestablishments in Slovenia